Mangamma Sabatham is a 1943 Indian Tamil-language film, starring Vasundhara Devi, Ranjan, N. S. Krishnan and T. A. Mathuram. The film was produced by S. S. Vasan and directed by T. G. Raghavachari, credited as Acharya. The film was remade in Hindi and Telugu as Mangala (1950 and 1951), in Sinhala as Mathalan (1955) and again in Telugu as Mangamma Sapatham (1965).

Plot 

Mangamma, a village girl, is humiliated by a prince and vows to take revenge. She vows to make the prince marry her and have a child who would whip the prince in the court. However, her plans are almost foiled when the prince imprisons her when she tries to seduce him. The story revolves on how she tricks him into falling in love with her and begets a son through the prince who ultimately whips him in court.

Cast 
Adapted from the song book:
 Vasundhara as Mangamma
 Ranjan as Sugunan, Jayapalan
 P. A. Subbaiah Pillai as Venkatachalam
 P. N. Seshagiri Bhagavathar as King
 P. V. Rao as Minister
 P. Appanna Iyengar as Adappakkaran
 Puliyoor Duraisami Iyer as Guard
 M. Ramamurthi as Sumathi
 A. S. Leelavathi as Rathi
 Kolathu Mani as Acrobat
 Ramasami as Sarangi
 N. S. Krishnan as Sathan
 T. A. Mathuram as Yamuna

Production 
Mangamma Sabatham is the first film that N. S. Krishnan and T. A. Mathuram featured for Gemini Studios. Krishnan trained hard to do the tight-rope walking scene himself without using a double.

Soundtrack 
Music was composed by S. Rajeswara Rao and M. D. Parthasarathy while the lyrics were penned by Papanasam Sivan and Kothamangalam Subbu.

Release and reception 
Mangamma Sabatham was released on 30 July 1943. The Indian Express wrote that despite the lengthy running time, it was "a perfect artistic unit in every detail".

Remakes 
Mangamma Sabatham was remade in Hindi in 1950 and Telugu in 1951, both titled Mangala. A Sinhala remake Mathalan was released in 1955. A second Telugu remake, Mangamma Sapatham, was released in 1965.

References

Bibliography

External links 

1940s Tamil-language films
1943 films
Films scored by S. Rajeswara Rao
Gemini Studios films
Indian black-and-white films
Tamil films remade in other languages